Volante (meaning "flying" and "steering wheel" in several languages) may refer to:

 Volante (carriage), two-wheeled carriage
 Volante, a racehorse, the 1885 American Derby winner
 The Volante, newspaper of the University of South Dakota, United States, since 1887
 The midfielder position in association football (Volante means defensive midfielder in Brazilian language but midfielder elsewhere in Latin America)
 Former Brazilian soldiers combatting cangaceiros
 Reparto volanti or Squadra volante, "flying squad" of the Italian State Police

People with the name Volante
 Carlos Volante (born 1905), Argentinian footballer

See also 

 Aston Martin Volante, type of car
 The Volante Handicap, American horse race established 1969
 Disco Volante (disambiguation)
 Papel volante, Portuguese popular literature
 Squadrone Volante, 17th-century "flying squad"